Sam Nazarian (born 1975) is a Persian-American businessman, investor and philanthropist. He is the founder, Chairman and CEO of SBE Entertainment Group.

Biography

Early life
Nazarian was born to a Persian Jewish family in Tehran in 1975. The Nazarian family immigrated to the United States following the Iranian Revolution. He is the son of Younes Nazarian who made a fortune along with his brother Izak Parviz Nazarian as an early investor in Qualcomm. He was raised in Beverly Hills, California where he attended Beverly Hills High School and later studied at the University of Southern California.

Career

Telecommunications
His first entrepreneurial venture was in 1998, when he invested a little bit of money into Platinum Wireless, a telecommunications business specializing in the distribution of Nextel software. Within one year of its founding, Platinum Wireless was the number one Nextel distributor in Southern California. He then entered the real estate industry by diversifying his family's assets into real estate holdings, beginning with the establishment of 3Wall Development in 1999. Under Sam's guidance 3Wall became one of Southern California's largest owners of multi-family housing.

Hospitality
With an uncompromising entrepreneurial instinct, Sam Nazarian is always ahead of the curve in creating and defining consumer trends and global lifestyle hospitality experiences. His unmatched career began with the founding of sbe Entertainment Group in 2002, which has turned into one of the most successful hospitality companies with sought-after lifestyle hospitality brands around the world including SLS Hotels, Hyde Lounge and Mondrian Hotels. 

In 2020, Nazarian sold the remaining 50% stake of sbe’s hotel platform to Accor Hotels to focus on C3’s global food-tech platform and full ownership of sbe’s Disruptive Restaurant Group. The $850 million cash and asset swap deal was groundbreaking for the lifestyle hotel category. Seeing an opportunity to expand his expertise into the culinary world, Sam added Disruptive Restaurant Group (DRG) to his entrepreneurial roster, which soon became the leading restaurant and nightlife group devoted to visionary and award-winning culinary experiences, with elevated concepts like Katsuya, S Bar, Life Rooftop in NYC, and the newly opened Sa’Moto and Hyde Sunset Kitchen + Cocktails. 

In February 2020, Sam launched C3 (Creating Culinary Communities), in partnership with Accor and Simon Property Group. Additional investors include Brookfield Global Asset Management, REEF Technology and participation from Egon Durban and Greg Mondre, Managing Partners and Co-CEOs of Silver Lake Partners, along with Dean Adler, Co-Founder of real estate investment firm Lubert-Adler. Sam’s vision for C3 is to re-imagine the food industry by introducing the world to a revolutionary way to approach food halls, ghost kitchens and mobile delivery via world-class culinary talent and technology. The first company of its kind, C3 is now the world’s fastest growing global food tech platform centered on digital kitchens and IP.

Producer
Nazarian has served as executive producer for the films Waiting..., Down in the Valley, Five Fingers, The Last Time, Pride, Mr. Brooks and College.

Honors
In 2006, Nazarian was honored as the youngest executive to be named one of the "Top 100 Most Powerful People in Southern California" by West, the Los Angeles Times Magazine, and was named among "The Influentials". Since 2008, Nazarian has served on the board of directors of the Southern California Institute of Architecture. The Beverly Hills High School basketball court was renamed "Sam Nazarian Court" after Nazarian, a 1993 Beverly Hills High School graduate, made a $200,000 donation to the Beverly Hills Athletic Alumni Association. In July 2009, Los Angeles Mayor Antonio Villaraigosa appointed Nazarian to the Board of Airport Commissioners of Los Angeles World Airports. In 2014, Nazarian was named to Fortune's 40 Under 40 list.

Personal life
Nazarian is married to Montenegrian model Emina Cunmulaj; they have two daughters and a son.

References

External links

Living people
1975 births
American casino industry businesspeople
American chief executives of travel and tourism industry companies
American telecommunications industry businesspeople
American film producers
American hoteliers
American investors
American people of Iranian-Jewish descent
American real estate businesspeople
American restaurateurs
Beverly Hills High School alumni
Businesspeople from Los Angeles
Iranian emigrants to the United States
Iranian Jews
Sam
Nightclub owners
People from Beverly Hills, California
Businesspeople from Las Vegas
People from Tehran
University of Southern California alumni
Exiles of the Iranian Revolution in the United States
Jewish American philanthropists